Eugen Kamber (18 September 1924 – 1 March 1991) was a Swiss cyclist. He competed in the team pursuit event at the 1948 Summer Olympics.

References

External links
 

1924 births
1991 deaths
Swiss male cyclists
Olympic cyclists of Switzerland
Cyclists at the 1948 Summer Olympics
People from Solothurn
Sportspeople from the canton of Solothurn
Tour de Suisse stage winners